Volodymyr Knysh (born 24 December 1970 Dnipropetrovsk, Ukrainian SSR) is a former Soviet and Ukrainian footballer and Ukrainian football coach who managed FC Naftovyk-Ukrnafta Okhtyrka.

References

External links
 
 Knysh profile at footballfacts.ru

1970 births
Living people
Footballers from Dnipro
Soviet footballers
Ukrainian footballers
FC Alga Bishkek players
FC Kryvbas Kryvyi Rih players
NK Veres Rivne players
Ukrainian Premier League players
Ukrainian football managers
Ukrainian expatriate football managers
Expatriate football managers in Moldova
FC Academia Chișinău managers
FC Skala Stryi (2004) managers
FC Naftovyk Okhtyrka managers
Association football defenders